Penicillium euglaucum is a species of the genus of Penicillium which was isolated from soil in Argentina.

See also
 List of Penicillium species

References

Further reading

  
 

euglaucum
Fungi described in 1940